The 1931–32 Central European International Cup was the second edition of the Central European International Cup played between 1931 and 1932. It was played in a round robin tournament between five teams involved in the tournament.

Final standings and results

Matches

Winner

Statistics

Goalscorers

References

External links

Central European International Cup